The 2021 BBL Playoffs were the concluding postseason of the 2020–21 Basketball Bundesliga season. The playoffs started on 19 May and ended on 13 June 2021.

Playoff qualifying

Bracket

Quarterfinals
The quarterfinals were played in a best of five format from 19 to 27 May 2021.

Riesen Ludwigsburg vs Brose Bamberg

Alba Berlin vs Hamburg Towers

EWE Baskets Oldenburg vs ratiopharm Ulm

Bayern Munich vs Crailsheim Merlins

Semifinals
The semifinals were played in a best of five format from 29 May to 5 June 2021.

Riesen Ludwigsburg vs Bayern Munich

Alba Berlin vs ratiopharm Ulm

Finals
The finals were played in a best of five format from 9 to 13 June 2021.

Notes

References

External links
Official website 

BBL Playoffs
2020–21 in German basketball leagues